Betti L. Sheldon (née Guiles; April 9, 1935 – July 23, 2020) was an American politician who served as a member of the Washington State Senate, representing the 23rd district from 1993 to 2005. A member of the Democratic Party, she defeated incumbent Republican and Senate president pro tempore Ellen Craswell in 1992.

References 

1937 births
2020 deaths
People from Bremerton, Washington
Democratic Party Washington (state) state senators
Women state legislators in Washington (state)
20th-century American politicians
21st-century American politicians
20th-century American women politicians
21st-century American women politicians